Creamery Pond is a small lake located north-northeast of Bloomville in Delaware County, New York. Creamery Pond drains southeast via Wright Brook which flows into the West Branch Delaware River.

See also
 List of lakes in New York

References 

Lakes of New York (state)
Lakes of Delaware County, New York